Martin Pembleton (born 1 June 1990) is an English footballer, who plays as attacking midfielder for Bottesford Town.

Lincoln City
Pembleton joined the Centre of Excellence at Lincoln City as a nine-year-old and progressed through the system, starting a two-year Apprenticeship for Sporting Excellence (ASE) scholarship with the club at the beginning of the 2006–2007 season. He continued his progression, making his first team debut on 24 March 2008, at home to Hereford United in the 2–1 win in League Two. In April 2008 Pembleton, alongside Gary King, was offered a one-year professional contract.

However, his failed to make a first team appearance as a professional being restricted to just six appearances as an unused substitute and on 6 March 2009 he joined Lincoln United on a month's loan. Following the close of the 2008–09 season, Pembleton was one of seven players released by the club.

Non-League career
After spending a trial period with Boston United, appearing in their 1-1 friendly draw with Lincoln City on 15 July 2009, he signed for Lincoln United before joining Winterton Rangers in December 2009 and Bottesford Town in the summer of 2010. In February 2011 he signed dual registration forms with Buxton enabling to play both for Bottesford and Buxton. In July 2012 he joined Goole.

References

External links
Lincoln City F.C. official archive profile

1990 births
Living people
Sportspeople from Scunthorpe
English footballers
Lincoln City F.C. players
Lincoln United F.C. players
Buxton F.C. players
Goole A.F.C. players
Bottesford Town F.C. players
English Football League players
Association football midfielders